Chirpan  is a town on the Tekirska River in Stara Zagora Province of south-central Bulgaria. It is the administrative centre of the homonymous Chirpan Municipality. As of 2021, the town had a population of 13,391 down from 15,109 in 2013.

Chirpan is located north of the Maritsa River on the Chirpan highlands, south-east of the Sredna Gora mountains. The town is a centre for wineries and viticulture.

History
The modern town is the successor of the Ancient Roman settlement of Sherampol and re-emerged in the beginning of the 15th century, its current name likely being derived from the Roman one. Upon his return from the Council of Sardica, Saint Athanasius established the first Christian monastery in Europe circa 344 near modern-day Chirpan in Bulgaria.

There has been extensive archaeological excavation at the Karasura (Carasura) site. During the Ottoman rule of Bulgaria, Chirpan was known for its craftsmen and agriculture. The town suffered badly from an earthquake on 18 April 1928.

Chirpan was the birthplace of Ottoman Turkish soldier Abdülkerim Nadir Pasha, and the Bulgarian poet Peyo Yavorov, whose native house is now a museum. Chirpan was the home of painter George Danchov. His house in the centre of the town is an excellent example of Bulgarian National Revival architecture.

Climate

Economy
There are 18,859 (2021) people in the municipality, two thirds of whom live in the town. 53% of the land is in cultivation, with major crops from wheat, sunflowers, cotton, grapes, and fruit trees. There is a 139 hectare Natura 2000 Special Protection Area for preservation of avian habitat along the Tekirska River.

Honour
Chirpan Peak on Livingston Island in the South Shetland Islands, Antarctica is named after Chirpan.

Notable people
Georgi Danchov, revolutionary
Ivan Dimov, actor
Ivan Kolev (wrestler)
Peyo Yavorov, poet
Stoyan Zaimov, revolutionary

Notes

References
 Diamante, Vincenzo (1975) Bulgaria: storia, vita, folclore e tutte le informazioni utili al turista Valmartina, Firenze, OCLC 3841667 (in Italian);
 Kondarev, Nikola (1987) Istoriia na Chirpan i Chirpansko Izd-vo na Otechestveniia front, Sofia, OCLC 19857260 (in Bulgarian);
This article is based in part on material from the Bulgarian Wikipedia.

External links
 
 
 
 
 N. Spassov, D. Geraads, L. Hristova, G.N. Markov, G. Merceron, T. Tzankov, K. Stoyanov, M. Böhme, A. Dimitrova. «A hominid tooth from Bulgaria: The last pre-human hominid of continental Europe» (Azmaka)

Towns in Bulgaria
Populated places in Stara Zagora Province